Melbourne High School may refer to the following high schools:

Melbourne High School (Victoria), Australia
Melbourne High School (Arkansas), USA
Melbourne High School (Melbourne, Florida), USA
Melbourne Central Catholic High School, Melbourne, Florida, USA